The British one pound (£1) coin is a denomination of sterling coinage. Its obverse bears the Latin engraving ELIZABETH II D G REG F D meaning, 'Elizabeth II, by the grace of God, Queen, Defender of the Faith'. It has featured the profile of Queen Elizabeth II since the original coin's introduction on 21 April 1983. Four different portraits of the Queen have been used, with the latest design by Jody Clark being introduced in 2015. The design on the reverse side of the current, 12-sided coin features four emblems to represent each of the nations of the United Kingdom — the English rose, the leek for Wales, the Scottish thistle, and the shamrock for Northern Ireland, also two or three oak leaves — emerging from a single 5-branched stem within a crown. In May 2022 the Royal Mint announced that the Kenyan-born artist  Michael Armitage is designing a new £1 coin which will be issued in 2023 and will celebrate the "history of the UK in the 21st century".

The original, round £1 coin replaced the Bank of England £1 note, which ceased to be issued at the end of 1984 and was removed from circulation on 11 March 1988, though still redeemable at the Bank's offices, like all English banknotes. One-pound notes continue to be issued in Jersey, Guernsey and the Isle of Man, and by the Royal Bank of Scotland, but the pound coin is much more widely used. A new, dodecagonal (12-sided) design of coin was introduced on 28 March 2017 and both new and old versions of the one pound coin circulated together until the older design was withdrawn from circulation on 15 October 2017. After that date, the older coin could only be redeemed at banks, although some retailers announced they would continue to accept it for a limited time, and they remained in use in the Isle of Man.

The main purpose of redesigning the coin was to combat counterfeiting. As of March 2014 there were an estimated 1,553 million of the original nickel-brass coins in circulation, of which the Royal Mint estimated in 2014 that just over 3% were counterfeit. The new coin, in contrast, is bimetallic like the current £2 coin, and features an undisclosed hidden security feature called "iSIS" (Integrated Secure Identification Systems).

The current 12-sided pound coins are legal tender to any amount when offered in repayment of a debt; however, the coin's legal tender status is not normally relevant for everyday transactions.

Design

To date, four different portraits of Elizabeth II have appeared on the obverse. The 12-sided design, introduced in March 2017, reverted to 

In summary:

 In 1983 and 1984 the portrait of Queen Elizabeth II by Arnold Machin appeared on the obverse, in which the Queen wears the "Girls of Great Britain and Ireland" Tiara.
 Between 1985 and 1997 the portrait by Raphael Maklouf was used, in which the Queen wears the George IV State Diadem.

In August 2005 the Royal Mint launched a competition to find new reverse designs for all circulating coins apart from the £2 coin. The winner, announced in April 2008, was Matthew Dent, whose designs were gradually introduced into the circulating British coinage from mid-2008. The designs for the 1p, 2p, 5p, 10p, 20p and 50p coins depict sections of the Royal Shield that form the whole shield when placed together. The shield in its entirety was featured on the £1 coin. The coin's obverse remained unchanged.

The design of the reverse of the original coin was changed each year from 1983 to 2008 to show, in turn, an emblem representing the UK, Scotland, Wales, Northern Ireland, and England, together with an appropriate edge inscription. This edge inscription could frequently be "upside-down" (when obverse is facing upward). From 2008, national-based designs were still minted, but alongside the new standard version and no longer in strict rotation. The inscription ONE POUND appeared on all reverse designs.

In common with non-commemorative £2 coins, the round £1 coin (except 2004–07 and the 2010–11 "capital cities" designs) had a mint mark: a small crosslet found on the milled edge that represents Llantrisant in South Wales, where the Royal Mint has been based since 1968.

The reverse of the new 12-sided, bimetallic pound coin, introduced on 28 March 2017, was chosen by a public design competition. The competition to design the reverse of this coin was opened in September 2014. It was won in March 2015 by 15-year-old David Pearce from Walsall, and unveiled by Chancellor George Osborne during his Budget announcement. The design features a rose, leek, thistle and shamrock bound by a crown.

Status as legal tender 
Current £1 coins are legal tender to any amount. However, "legal tender" has a very specific and narrow meaning which relates only to the repayment of debt to a creditor, not to everyday shopping or other transactions. Specifically, coins of particular denominations are said to be "legal tender" when a creditor must by law accept them in redemption of a debt. The term does not mean – as is often thought – that a shopkeeper has to accept a particular type of currency in payment. Shopkeepers are under no obligation to accept any specific type of payment, whether legal tender or not; conversely they have the discretion to accept any payment type they wish.

Mintage figures

Round coin
Mintage figures below represent the number of coins of each date released for circulation. Mint sets have been produced since 1982; where mintages on or after that date indicate 'none', there are examples contained within those sets.

All years except 1998 and 1999 have been issued into circulation, although the number issued has varied enormously – 1983, 1984 and 1985 in particular had large mintages to facilitate the changeover from paper notes, while some years such as 1988 are only rarely seen (although 1988 is more noticeable as it has a unique reverse). Production since 1997 has been reduced, thanks to the introduction of the circulating two pound coin.

The final round coins minted for 2016 and the 2015 Shield of the Royal Arms 5th portrait did not enter circulation, as they were only available through commemorative sets. These were the shield from the Royal Coat of Arms by Matthew Dent, and a design by Gregory Cameron, Bishop of St Asaph, of four heraldic beasts.

12-sided coin

Counterfeiting

During later years of the round pound's use, Royal Mint surveys estimated the proportion of counterfeit £1 coins in circulation. This was estimated at 3.04% in 2013, a rise from 2.74%. The figure previously announced in 2012 was 2.86%, following the prolonged rise from 0.92% in 2002–2003 to 0.98% in 2004, 1.26% in 2005, 1.69% in 2006, 2.06% in 2007, 2.58% in 2008, 2.65% in 2009, 3.07% in 2010 and 3.09% in 2011. Figures were generally reported in the following year; in 2008 (as reported in 2009), the highest levels of counterfeits were in Northern Ireland (3.6%) and South East England and London (2.97%), with the lowest being in North West England. Coin testing companies estimated in 2009 that the actual figure was about twice the Mint's estimate, suggesting that the Mint was underplaying the figures so as not to undermine confidence in the coin. It is illegal to pass on counterfeit currency knowingly; the official advice is to hand it in, with details of where received, to the police, who will retain it and investigate. One article suggested that "given that fake coins are worthless, you will almost certainly be better off not even looking". The recipient also has recourse against the supplier in such cases.

Counterfeits are put into circulation by dishonest people, then circulated inadvertently by others who are unaware; in many cases banks do not check, and circulate counterfeits. In 2011 the BBC television programme Fake Britain withdrew 1,000 £1 coins from each of five major banks and found that each batch contained between 32 and 38 counterfeits; the Mint estimated that about 31 per 1,000 £1 coins were counterfeit. Some of the counterfeits were found by automated machinery, others could be detected only by expert visual inspection.

In July 2010, following speculation that the Royal Mint would have to consider replacing £1 coins with a new design because of the fakes, bookmakers Paddy Power offered odds of 6/4 (bet £4 to win £6, plus the £4 stake back; decimal odds of 2.5), that the £1 coin would be removed from circulation.

Some counterfeits were of poor quality, with obviously visible differences (less sharply defined, lacking intricate details, edge milling and markings visibly wrong). Many better counterfeits can be detected by comparing the orientation of the obverse and reverse—they should match in genuine modern UK coins, but very often did not in counterfeit round £1. The design on the reverse must be correct for the stamped year (e.g., a 1996 coin should have a Celtic cross). It was difficult to manufacture round pounds with properly-produced edges; the milling (grooves) was often incomplete or poor and the inscription (often "DECUS ET TUTAMEN") sometimes poorly produced or in the wrong typeface. A shiny coin with less wear than its date suggests is also suspect, although it may be a genuine coin that has rarely been used.

Counterfeit coins are made by different processes including casting, stamping, electrotyping, and copying with a pantograph or spark erosion. In a 2009 survey, 99% of fake £1 coins found in cash centres were made of a nickel-brass, of which three fifths contained some lead and a fifth were of a very similar alloy to that used by the Royal Mint.  The remaining 1% were made of simple copper-zinc brass, or lead or tin, or both. Those made of lead or tin may have a gold-coloured coating; counterfeits made of acrylic plastic containing metal powder to increase weight were occasionally found.

The final 'round pounds' were minted in December 2015; the replacement, a new 12-sided design, was introduced in 2017, the earliest dated as 2016. The coin has a 12-edged shape, similar to the pre-decimal brass threepence coin; it has roughly the same size as the previous £1 coin, and is bi-metallic like most £2 coins. The new design is intended to make counterfeiting more difficult, and also has an undisclosed hidden security feature called "iSIS" (Integrated Secure Identification Systems), thought to be a code embedded in the top layer of metal on the obverse of the coin, visible only under a specific wavelength of ultraviolet light.

Current two-pound coins, being bi-metallic (excluding some rarely tendered commemorative issues), remain harder to counterfeit than the round pound was; such counterfeits would often easily seen to have wrong colours.

Other pound coins that entered circulation
While the round pound was operational, others that entered circulation, although not legal tender in the UK, were some £1 coins of British Crown Dependencies, Gibraltar and UK South Atlantic Overseas Territories. Most coins of these territories, in all denominations, were of the same size and composition as a UK equivalent and most bore the same portraits of the UK monarch. After the UK replaced its round pound coins, none of these territories rushed to do so, except Gibraltar, which continues to use Gibraltarian pound coins as legal tender as well as the new UK pound coins.

Further reading
In an April 1993 The New Yorker article "Real Britannia", Julian Barnes describes the meetings to choose the 1994–1997 reverse designs. This is reprinted in his book Letters from London as "Britannia's New Bra Size".

See also

 Banknotes of the pound sterling
 Coin counterfeiting
 Coins of the pound sterling
 Sovereign — gold coin with a (nominal) value of £1

References

Source
 Coincraft's Standard Catalogue English & UK Coins 1066 to Date, Richard Lobel, Coincraft.

External links
Royal Mint – £1 coin
Royal Mint – the new pound coin
One Pound, Coin Type from United Kingdom – Online Coin Club

Coins of the United Kingdom
Currencies introduced in 1983
One-base-unit coins